Angarsky (masculine), Angarskaya (feminine), or Angarskoye (neuter) is the name of several rural localities in Russia:
Angarsky, Irkutsk Oblast, a settlement in Alarsky District of Ust-Orda Buryat Okrug of Irkutsk Oblast
Angarsky, Krasnoyarsk Krai, a settlement in Angarsky Selsoviet of Boguchansky District of Krasnoyarsk Krai